Ancylobacter  is a genus of aerobic bacteria from the family of Xanthobacteraceae.

Phylogeny
The currently accepted taxonomy is based on the List of Prokaryotic names with Standing in Nomenclature (LPSN). The phylogeny is based on whole-genome analysis.

References

Further reading 
 
 

Hyphomicrobiales
Bacteria genera